Marta Magdalena Stępień (born 11 March 1994) is a Polish-Canadian model and beauty pageant titleholder who was crowned Miss International Canada 2017 and Miss Universe Canada 2018, representing Canada in Miss International 2017 pageant in Tokyo, Japan, ending up being unplaced, but she also represented Canada at the Miss Universe 2018 pageant, finishing as a Top 10 finalist.

Personal life
Stępień was born in Warsaw, Poland and raised in Windsor, Ontario. She is a student of Biomedical Engineering Technology at St. Clair College and is an applied researcher. She speaks French, Polish, German and English. She is also a professional model.

In 2021 she married one of the 35 richest businessmen in México (said Forbes Magazine) Rodrigo Herrera.

Pageantry

Miss Universe Canada 2017
Stępień finished as the 1st Runner-up at Miss Universe Canada 2017 represented Upper Canada. Meanwhile, the official winner was Lauren Howe from Ontario Province crowned as 2017 winner and competed at Miss Universe 2017 in Las Vegas, United States. She placed in Top 10.

Miss International 2017
Stępień represented Canada at the Miss International 2017 beauty contest in Tokyo, Japan but was unplaced. The pageant was won by Kevin Lilliana of Indonesia.

Reinado Internacional del Café 2018
Stępień also represented her country at Reinado Internacional del Café 2018 in Colombia where she finished as Virreina to Carmen Serrano of Spain.

Miss Universe Canada 2018
Stępień represented South Ontario was crowned Miss Universe Canada 2018 at the George Weston Recital Hall, Toronto Centre for the Arts on 18 August 2018. She succeeded outgoing Miss Universe Canada 2017, Lauren Howe.

Miss Universe 2018
Stępień represented Canada at Miss Universe 2018 in Bangkok, Thailand. She wore a gown made by designer Michael Cinco.  She placed in the top 10 out of 94 contestants.

References

External links

1994 births
Living people
Miss International 2017 delegates
Miss Universe 2018 contestants
Canadian beauty pageant winners
Female models from Ontario
People from Warsaw
Polish emigrants to Canada